The Javořice Highlands is a mountain range in the Czech Republic. The highlands, together with the Jevišovice Highlands threshold, form the Western-Moravian part of Moldanubian Zone - east south part of Bohemian Massif.

Geography
The Javořice Highlands rise to the north of the Gmünd, Lower Austria between Slavonice, and the Studená and Mrákotín in the north.

To the southeast is the Holbruner Wald (Holbrun Forest) in Lower Austria part of Javořice Highlands as well and in the east Jevišovice Highlands. The Javořice Highlands naturally established Bohemian-Moravian border.
The mountain range is 76% forested, though mainly by plantations. The forests are in good condition. For the landscape ary typical numerous bogs and ponds.

The primary composition of the range is carboniferous-cambrian granite and granodiorite. Quartz veins are common. Soil horizon is mainly cambisol.

The Thaya (parallel valley), and Jihlava (source), Nežárka (source) as well among others, originates here.

Towns
The area is sparsely populated. There are no larger settlements. The most populated towns in the highlands are Nová Bystřice and Strmilov.

Gallery

Further reading
 Geografický místopisný slovník, Academia, Praha, 1993. 

Mountain ranges of the Czech Republic
Moravia
Bohemia
Highlands